Douglas Gaston Sydney Camfield (8 May 1931 – 27 January 1984) was a British television director, active from the 1960s to the 1980s.

Early life

Camfield studied at the York School of Art and aimed to work for The Walt Disney Company. He was commissioned into the Royal Army Service Corps in 1951 during his national service. Later that year, he transferred to the West Yorkshire Regiment (Territorial Army). He was promoted to lieutenant in 1952 and was training to be in the Special Air Service, but due to an injury he pulled out of the application process. It has often been noted by those who worked with him that Camfield always retained an affection for the army and brought military standards of organisation to the programmes he subsequently directed.

Career
His directing credits included Doctor Who, Z-Cars, Paul Temple, Public Eye, The Lotus Eaters, Van der Valk, The Sweeney, The Onedin Line, Blake's 7, Shoestring, The Professionals, Out of the Unknown, The Nightmare Man, the BBC dramatisation of Beau Geste, and Ivanhoe, the 1982 television movie. Camfield was known for his strict professionalism and was held in high esteem by many actors, producers and writers.

Doctor Who 

He is particularly well known for his work on Doctor Who and was production assistant on its earliest serials, both the pilot and broadcast versions of An Unearthly Child, and Marco Polo. Camfield directed many other stories in its first thirteen years:
Planet of Giants (episode 3 only)
The Crusade
The Time Meddler
The Daleks' Master Plan 
The Web of Fear 
The Invasion 
Inferno  (Camfield directed the first two episodes and the location scenes for episodes 3–7; after Camfield suffered a heart attack during the production, the rest was directed by producer Barry Letts, who was uncredited)
Terror of the Zygons 
The Seeds of Doom

One of Camfield's notable contributions to the series was the casting of Nicholas Courtney as Brigadier Lethbridge-Stewart, who became one of the longest-running and most popular characters in its history.

He submitted a script for the series to producer Philip Hinchcliffe called The Lost Legion, which involved aliens and the French Foreign Legion (a subject which fascinated him). However, the story never made it into production.

He was also one of eight faces whose images are seen during the mind-bending sequence of the serial The Brain of Morbius (1976), inferred to be early incarnations of the Doctor. Notably, the incarnation represented by his image appeared again in a flashback sequence of the Virgin New Adventures novel Cold Fusion.

Personal life

Camfield died of a heart attack on 27 January 1984. He was married to actress Sheila Dunn, whom he cast in the Doctor Who stories The Daleks' Master Plan, The Invasion, and Inferno. They had a son, Joggs, who featured heavily in a DVD tribute documentary, Remembering Douglas Camfield, which was included in the 2013 DVD release of Camfield's Doctor Who serial Terror of the Zygons.

Legacy
In 2013, as part of the fiftieth anniversary celebrations for Doctor Who, the BBC produced a drama depicting the creation and early days of the series. Camfield appears as a character in the drama An Adventure in Space and Time, portrayed by actor Sam Hoare.

References

External links

1931 births
1984 deaths
20th-century British Army personnel
British television directors
Royal Army Service Corps officers
West Yorkshire Regiment officers